The Seven Houses on Lake Shore Drive District is a historic district in Chicago, Illinois, United States.  The district was built between 1889 and 1917 by various architects including Benjamin Marshall, Holabird & Roche, Howard Van Doren Shaw, and McKim, Mead & White. It was designated a Chicago Landmark on June 28, 1989.

References

1880s architecture in the United States
1890s architecture in the United States
1900s architecture in the United States
1910s architecture in the United States
Historic districts in Chicago
Chicago Landmarks